The 1994 NatWest Trophy was the 14th NatWest Trophy.  It was an English limited overs county cricket tournament which was held between 21 June and 3 September 1994. The tournament was won by Worcestershire County Cricket Club who defeated Warwickshire County Cricket Club by 8 wickets in the final at Lord's.

Format
The 18 first-class counties, were joined by twelve Minor Counties:  Bedfordshire, Berkshire, Cambridgeshire, Cheshire, Cumberland, Devon, Lincolnshire, Norfolk, Northumberland, Oxfordshire, Staffordshire and Wales Minor Counties.  The Ireland national cricket team and the Scotland national cricket team also participated.  Teams who won in the first round progressed to the second round. The winners in the second round then progressed to the quarter-final stage.  Winners from the quarter-finals then progressed to the semi-finals from which the winners then went on to the final at Lord's which was held on 3 September 1994.

First round

Second round

Quarter-finals

Semi-finals

Final

References

External links
CricketArchive tournament page 

Friends Provident Trophy seasons
Natwest Trophy, 1994
NatWest Group